The University of the Philippines Manila (UPM) is a state-funded research university located in Ermita, Manila, Philippines. It is known for being the country's center of excellence in the health sciences, including health professional education, training, and research. It is the oldest of eight constituent universities of the University of the Philippines System, even predating the founding of UP by three years. Originally established on December 1, 1905, as the Philippine Medical School and later called as the UP College of Medicine and Surgery on June 10, 1907. It was renamed as University of the Philippines Manila in 1983.

UP Manila administers and operates the Philippine General Hospital, the largest medical center and the national referral center for health in the Philippines. The university is also the home of the National Institutes of Health that led early COVID-19 testing and conducts  health research in various fields.

Its 14-hectare campus occupies two large city blocks and it contains pre-war heritage buildings and structures built during the American Period designed by American Architect William E. Parsons, which were declared by the National Historical Commission of the Philippines as historical landmarks.

Since 2001, the College of Medicine and the College of Nursing has been recognized as Centers of Excellence by the Commission on Higher Education. Its Clinical, Pre-Clinical, and Health subjects was ranked 126-150th in the Times Higher Education World University Rankings  while the life sciences and medicine programs of the University of the Philippines System placed 401-450th in the QS World University Rankings by Subject Area.

History

Philippine Medical School

On December 1, 1905, the Philippine Medical School was established under Commonwealth Act No. 1415. It opened on June 10, 1907, and was housed at the School for the Deaf and Blind located on Malecon Drive (now Bonifacio Drive). On June 18, 1908, the Philippine Assembly passed the Act No. 1870, also known as the University Charter, marking the birth of the University of the Philippines. The Act renamed the Philippine Medical School as the University of the Philippines College of Medicine and Surgery. The control and management of the medical school was entrusted to the University of the Philippines Board of Regents on December 8, 1910. Its name was shortened to the University of the Philippines College of Medicine on March 1, 1923.

UP opened its doors in 1909 with the School of Fine Arts, the College of Liberal Arts, College of Medicine, College of Veterinary Medicine, College of Engineering and the College of Law. It also operates the UP College of Agriculture in Los Baños, Laguna. These schools and colleges, established on different locations, were transferred to the UP Campus along Pedro Gil Street, Ermita, Manila on July 1, 1910, except for the College of Agriculture.

In 1907, the US government passed a law establishing the Philippine General Hospital (PGH). It was founded by Dean C. Worcester, an American who was a member of the United States Philippine Commission. On September 1, 1910, the 350-bed capacity hospital was opened to the public for health care delivery and clinical instruction and training of medical students. Dr. Paul Freer served as its first Medical School Dean until 1912. On February 5, 1915, the Philippine Legislative Act No. 2467 reorganized the Training School for Nurses into the PGH School of Nursing and established it as a department of PGH. A few years later, in 1914, 1915 and 1927, the School of Pharmacy, Department of Dentistry and the School of Public Health were created, respectively, under the UP College of Medicine. These units eventually became full-fledged degree-granting units in 1935, 1948, and 1932, respectively.

World War II

The university was destroyed during the Battle of Manila in 1945. However, the College of Medicine under then Dean, Dr. Antonio G. Sison, and PGH were still able to fulfill their mandate of attending to the injured and the sick. On December 15, 1948, much the university transferred to its sprawling 493 hectare campus in Diliman, Quezon City. Three units, Medicine, Dentistry and Public Health, were left behind in the war-torn UP Campus in Manila. On the 40th anniversary of the University of the Philippines in 1949, the original Oblation was transferred to UP's Diliman Campus in Quezon City from its original site along Padre Faura Street in Manila as a symbol of transfer of administrative seat. In April 1948, the UP College of Nursing, which established in the Diliman Campus, instituted the first baccalaureate program in Nursing in the Philippines. More academic units were established in the 1960s. These included the School of Allied Medical Professions (1962), housed then at the National Orthopedic Hospital (now called the Philippine Orthopedic Center), and the Philippine Eye Research Institute in 1965.

Health Sciences Center

With the clamor to meet the health science education needs of the growing population, a Health Sciences Center within the University of the Philippines was created through the passage of RA 5163 on June 17, 1967. It was mandated to seek and emphasize the highest standards of training and research in the various health sciences. However, the Center at the Diliman Campus did not materialize due to fiscal constraints.

In 1972, the UP College Manila was instituted as the first extension unit to offer liberal arts courses. Thereafter, UP was reorganized into the University of the Philippines System to effect institutional unity, while allowing decentralization of authority and autonomy of the component units through Presidential Decree No. 58, promulgated on November 20, 1972, under the administration of President Ferdinand E. Marcos. It was approved by the Board of Regents at its 828th meeting on November 21, 1972, and was implemented on January 1, 1973.

The UP Health Sciences Center became an autonomous component of the UP System through Executive Order No. 519 dated January 24, 1979. At that time, the center was composed of the College of Medicine, College of Pharmacy, College of Dentistry, Institute of Public Health (now the College of Public Health), School of Allied Medical Professions (now the College of Allied Medical Professions), Philippine General Hospital, UP Health Service, Philippine Eye Referral
Institute (renamed as the Institute of Ophthalmology), National Teacher Training Center for the Health Professions, Comprehensive Community Health Program, and the Anesthesiology Center Western Pacific. The last two units have since been abolished.

Autonomy

Through Executive Order No. 4, issued by then UP President Edgardo Angara on October 22, 1982, the UP Health Sciences Center was renamed as the University of the Philippines Manila and it became the second autonomous unit of the UP System. The College of Nursing and the College of Pharmacy located in UP Diliman were transferred to the UP Manila, where they joined the rest of the health science units. On December 21, 1983, UPM underwent its first reorganization through Executive Order No. 11 integrating the UP Health Sciences Center and the College of Arts and Sciences (formerly called UP College Manila).

The Board of Regents approved the second reorganization of the UP Manila at its 1007th and 1008th meetings on December 21, 1987, and February 11, 1988, respectively. This reorganization transformed and crystallized UP Manila's philosophy, mission, organizational structure, governance and academic programs to what they are today. In 1989, the Institute of Health Sciences which used to be an extension unit of the College of Medicine, was transformed into the School of Health Sciences and became an independent unit.

Contemporary history

Since 2001, the College of Medicine and the College of Nursing are recognized as Centers of Excellence by the Commission on Higher Education. In addition, the College of Nursing is a WHO Collaborating Center for Leadership in Nursing Development in the Asia-Pacific region. The Southeast Asian Ministers of Education Organization named the College of Public Health as the SEAMEO-TROPMED Regional Center for Public Health, Hospital Administration, and Environmental and Occupational Health. The National Teacher Training Center for the Health Professions is a WHO Regional Education Development Center for Health Professions Education.

The centennial celebration of the University of the Philippines began on January 8, 2008. As part of UP's centenary, an Oblation statue in front of the Philippine General Hospital was unveiled in December 2008.

In 2013, UP Manila was badly criticized when Kristel Tejada, a 16-year-old behavioral sciences student, committed suicide because she couldn't pay for her tuition fee for the second semester and was left with no choice but to drop out of school. The Tejada family also has to pay the loan Kristel had taken for her first semester tuition. This event led to numerous student protests nationwide, mostly coming from the state universities and colleges, and the students from the UP System. The university was later pressured to lift its "no-late-payment" policy on tuition.

During the COVID-19 pandemic, UP Manila became fundamental to the country's primary healthcare response. In March 2020, the UPM National Institutes of Health was designated COVID testing center and started COVID testing through its locally produced SARS CoV-2 PCR Detection Kit. Later that month, the Department of Health assigned the Philippine General Hospital as COVID-19 referral center for Metro Manila. To make room for COVID patient wards, PGH temporarily suspended outpatient and elective surgery services and offered teleconsultations instead. The hospital, which already lacked spaces for patients, suffered patient overcrowding while it remained understaffed. Through the years, PGH workers also protested against low salaries, job contracting, delayed hazard pay and COVID-19 benefits, insufficient equipment, and budget cuts.

To address the lack of funding and equipment, several UPM units developed different COVID-19 technologies, including the GenAmplify™ COVID-19 rRT-PCR Detection Kit; OstreaVent II; Mechanical Ambu Bag Insufflator; Ginhawa Ventilator; SIBOL innovations such as the RxBox-Telemetry, SIBOL Telepresence, Powered Air-Purifying Respirator, SaniPod, E-Steth Project, and Ultraviolet Irradiation Cabinet; UP Manila Bayanihan Na! Employee Symptoms Tracking System (BESTS); and PGH Bayanihan Center Current Inventory Levels and Donations Tracker. In March 2021, the first official COVID-19 vaccine in the Philippines was administered at PGH to its director, Dr. Gerardo Legazpi.

Campus

The University of the Philippines Manila is situated in the bustling area of Ermita, Manila. Its  campus is the home to the Philippine General Hospital and the National Institutes of Health. It is the second largest university campus in the City of Manila after the  University of Santo Tomas. The campus is bounded by United Nations Avenue to the north, Taft Avenue to the east, María Orosa Avenue and Robinsons Place Manila to the west and by Pedro Gil Street to the south. The university is served by the United Nations and Pedro Gil Station of the LRT Line 1.

UP Manila buildings vary in age from the American era buildings built in early 1900s to high rise facilities in 2020s. Most of UPM's buildings are designed in Neoclassical style, a theme which has been preserved in recent architectural additions. Many buildings in the campus were designed by American Architect William E. Parsons, in accordance with the Burnham Plan of Manila. The Calderon Hall of the College of Medicine and the Administration Building of the Philippine General Hospital were the first buildings constructed on the campus site. PGH became the template for many tropical hospitals in Asia and tropical America. This was followed by the construction of the University Hall (now Department of Justice) and Rizal Hall in the Padre Faura Street, both used by most UP colleges and executive offices before the World War II.  In 2013, the National Historical Commission of the Philippines (NHCP) declared several sites within the campus as heritage zones and were listed in the National Registry of Historic Sites and Structures in the Philippines.

The maintenance and planning for campus buildings are provided by the UP Manila Campus Planning, Development and Maintenance Office (CPDMO) It manages the creation of spaces that support and enhance teaching, research, and public service activities of UP Manila. It is also tasked to recover the lots and heritage buildings that belongs to the university which are now occupied by the National Bureau of Investigation, Court of Appeals, Department of Justice, and the Supreme Court of the Philippines. The Supreme Court has announced its plans to vacate its UP Campus site in Manila and move to the Bonifacio Capital District in Taguig with the Court of Appeals upon the completion of their new state-of-the-art building. The Department of Justice is also slated to move to New Clark City. CPDMO is located on the former UP College of Dentistry Annex Building, which was constructed in the 1960s.

Academic facilities and satellite campuses

The UP Manila University Library and its nine college-based units compose the campus's library network, and as of October 2000 the library has a total collection of 189,874 volumes, including videos, sound recordings, and photographs. Since 1995, the University Library was a member of the Department of Science and Technology – Engineering, Science and Education Library Network Project. The UP College Medicine Library, officially as the Dr. Florentino B. Herrera, Jr. Medical Library, is a center for the study of medical and clinical sciences, and its collections are particularly strong in the subjects of basic and clinical biomedical subjects. It occupies the building adjacent to the University Library. Both library buildings were permanently closed in 2016, after they were endangered when the foundation of the nearby under-construction UP College of Medicine Academic Center sank. Both buildings are now slated for demolition and will be replaced with a new University Library Building.

On October 22, 2014, the university inaugurated the UP Manila Museum of a History of Ideas. The museum showcases the contributions of the University of the Philippines to the critical imagination that shaped the Philippines as a nation in the early 20th century. It was opened to the public on December 2, 2014.

Aside from the main campus, UPM operates on other regional locations. The UP Manila School of Health Sciences operates on four campuses located throughout the Philippines. Its main campus was the UPM-SHS Palo Campus in Palo, Leyte. The other three campuses are the UPM-SHS Baler, Aurora Extension Campus in Luzon, the UPM-SHS Koronadal City Campus in Mindanao, and the UPM-SHS Tarlac City Extension campus.

The Philippine General Hospital has also several planned expansions beyond its Manila headquarters. In 2019, a PGH polyclinic named the Philippine General Hospital Satellite for Sports Medicine and Wellness (PGH-SSMW) was opened to serve the 2019 Southeast Asian Games. It will be eventually expanded into a full hospital to serve the New Clark City, alongside future branches of the College of Medicine and the National Institutes of Health in the upcoming UP campus in the area. The university also aims to build PGH branches in Los Baños and Diliman to build a hospital network to service UP constituents. However, the construction of PGH Diliman is facing scrutiny due to its impact to a protected forest area and its prioritization over upgrade of the current Manila facility.

Academics

UP Manila offers 79 health-related undergraduate and graduate programs in nine degree-granting units. The university's academic units are broadly organized into seven colleges, the National Teacher Training Center for Health Professions, and the School of Health Sciences. The Philippine General Hospital and National Institutes of Health also form part of the university as training and research centers. As the leading institution for medical education and research, UP Manila is regarded as the National Health Sciences Center of the Philippines and designated as one of the four pillars of the Metro Manila Health Research and Development Consortium.

UP Manila develops programs that serve as models and benchmarks of health education and health care in the Philippines. Many of the pioneering curricular programs are offered only in the university even until now, such as the seven-year Integrated Arts and Medicine (INTARMED) Program, MS in Medical Informatics, MS in bioethics, Master of Rehabilitation Science, MS in Clinical Audiology, and MA in Health Policy Studies. The university also offered the first baccalaureate programs in nursing, organizational communication, and public health in the Philippines. Moreover, the UPM School of Health Sciences offers the first stepladder health sciences curriculum in Asia that allows students to take integrated courses on community health work, midwifery, nursing, and community medicine towards a Doctor of Medicine degree. Its community-oriented programs have been lauded worldwide for directly admitting scholars from targeted poor communities in need of health professionals.

UP Manila units are also nationally and internationally recognized. The College of Medicine and the College of Nursing has been recognized by the Commission on Higher Education as National Centers of Excellence since 2001. In addition, the World Health Organization has designated the College of Nursing as WHO Collaborating Center for Leadership in Nursing Development and the National Teacher Training Center for the Health Professions as WHO Regional Development Center in Health Professions Education in the Western Pacific Region. The College of Public Health also hosts the SEAMEO-Tropmed Regional Centre for Public Health, Hospital Administration, Environmental and Occupational Health.

Admissions

Admission to the university is very selective. Prospective undergraduate students must pass the University of the Philippines College Admission Test (UPCAT), which is part of the admission requirements for all the component units of the University of the Philippines System.

An applicant for the Doctor of Medicine program can enter through direct entry at Learning Unit 1, where only high school graduates from the top male and female UPCAT scorers are accepted, or lateral entry at Learning Unit 3, where college graduates who passed the National Medical Admission Test (NMAT) are accepted. On the other hand, the School of Health Sciences directly admits scholars nominated by the far-flung communities served by its campuses.

Financial aid

The university spends most of its budget to the students. For the school year of 2017 to 2018, UP Manila offers tuition-free education to its medical students through a cash grants program. It was funded through the ₱317.1 million allocation for eight selected state universities and colleges nationwide which offers medical programs, with each institution receiving an allotment of ₱39 million. Students who will benefit from this program are expected to render a one-year "return service" to the Philippines for every cash grants he or she receives. The program, although separate in nature, is still a part of the ₱8.3 billion free tuition program for undergraduate students in all state universities and colleges nationwide, or the Universal Access to Quality Tertiary Education Act, which prompted the university to stop collecting tuition fees to all undergraduate students indefinitely.

Research

In research, UP Manila has been pursuing its mandate by generating and disseminating knowledge and technologies that can effectively contribute to the improvement of the quality of life of Filipinos. Its research outputs have greatly influenced the thrusts and directions of national health care programs and have been used as basis for policy formulation and implementation.

The research units of UP Manila are housed in the National Institutes of Health (NIH), which also serves as the national health research center of the Philippines. As governed by the Health Research and Development Act of 1998, NIH conducts biomedical and public health research intended improve Philippine health services, promotion, and systems. The Manila Studies Program, a regional studies research center based in the College of Arts and Sciences, also conducts research and projects on heritage, urban development, and policy-related issues.

As the national university, UP Manila also provides technical support and research on health legislation. UP Manila research experts have worked towards the passage of the Newborn Screening Act in 2004, Universal Newborn Hearing Screening and Intervention Act of 2009, and the Rare Diseases Act of the Philippines of 2016 among others. UP Manila has also strongly opposed the conduct of local scientific studies and the legalization of medical marijuana.

Researches which exerted the biggest national impact on Philippine health care include several research-based program recommendations generated through the national surveys on blindness and the studies on Hepatitis B, diarrhea, and common parasitic infections, which were adopted by the Department of Health; commercialization of five herbal medicinal formulations (lagundi, yerba buena, tsaang gubat, sambong and akapulko); textbooks and instructional manuals which are also used by other academic institutions; and the performance evaluation of PhilHealth, the country's national health insurance program. Since the COVID-19 pandemic in 2020, the National Institutes Health has produced various research on COVID-19 testing, healthcare, and vaccination. NIH also locally produced coronavirus test kits and ventilators to address the lack of health supplies and equipment.

UP Manila Research Ethics Board

The University of the Philippines Manila Research Ethics Board (UPMREB) was created on September 27, 2010, to integrate all existing ethics committees in UP Manila under a single research ethics board with component review panels, and guided by a unified set of standard operating procedures (SOPs). This initiative was intended to streamline and harmonize the process of ethics review, maximize the utilization of human and institutional resources, and provide a supportive and enabling environment for research in the university. Its oversight applies to faculty, personnel, and students doing research in UP Manila; non-UP Manila researchers doing research in UP Manila; and non-UP Manila researchers doing research in non-UP Manila sites with no local ethics review committee (as mandated by the Philippine Health Research Ethics Board).

Prior to the establishment of the UPMREB, the different component panels already had existing standard operating procedures (SOPs), now superseded, which were used as the basis for the content of this current integrated manual. One important contribution of this integration is the opportunity to closely review the old SOPs towards a more practicable set of procedures guiding UPMREB work.

Rankings and reputation
UP Manila is recognized as one of the top higher education institutions in the country and the region. The Center for World University Ranking (CWUR) ranks UPM as second among all Philippine universities and 1,648th worldwide. Its Clinical, Pre-Clinical, and Health subjects were also ranked 126-150th in the Times Higher Education World University Rankings  while the life sciences and medicine programs of the University of the Philippines System placed 394th in the QS World University Rankings by Subject Area.

The excellence of UP Manila's health science programs is further proven by the consistent 100% passing of its graduates in nearly all health licensure examinations every year and their placement in the top 10/20 posts of each exam. UP Manila consistently achieves the highest national passing rate among all health universities and colleges in the country, a feat which has been recognized many times by the Professional Regulation Commission. UPM has been distinguished as top performing school in medicine, nursing, pharmacy, dentistry, and rehabilitation 
sciences licensure examinations.

Student life

UP Manila is a part on the University Belt, a de facto sub-district of the City of Manila where there is a high concentration or a cluster of colleges and universities.

Activism

Students of UP Manila are known for their activism, since the Supreme Court of the Philippines, the Court of Appeals, and the Department of Justice are located within its grounds. The university has plenty of student groups focused on political change. It also has a variety of partisan groups ranging from liberal to conservative, and several third party organizations.

People

The university has produced remarkable alumni in their respective fields. Dr. Carmencita M. David-Padilla is the 9th and current chancellor of the university, who is also an alumnus of UP Manila where she obtained her medicine degree in 1981. She has been recently reappointed will serve from November 1, 2017, to October 31, 2020.

20th century
Notable people from UP Manila include Elpidio Quirino, the sixth President of the Philippines, who graduated from the university with a law degree in 1915. Fe del Mundo, a pediatrician, was known as the first woman to be admitted as a student in Harvard Medical School, and was the founder of the first pediatric hospital in the Philippines. She graduated from the university in 1933 as valedictorian of her class. In 1924, Alejandro Melchor, who served as a Secretary of National Defense, obtained his civil engineering degree with the highest honors at that time when the UP College of Engineering was still based in Manila. Other notable UP Manila alumni includes Martino Abellana, a renowned Cebuano painter, and Trinidad Tarrosa-Subido, a linguist and poet.

21st century
Political figures who were graduates of UP Manila include Jinggoy Estrada, a Philippine Senator, and Enrique Manalo, who served as the Undersecretary for Policy of the Department of Foreign Affairs. Revolutionary leader Nur Misuari was also a graduate of UP Manila, who obtained his political science degree in 1962.

UP Manila alumni who served in the field of medical and health profession include three Secretaries of the Department of Health: Juan Flavier (1992-1995), who also served as a Senator from 1995 to 2007, Esperanza Cabral (2009-2010), and Enrique Ona (2010 to 2014).

Americans who graduated from UP Manila include two Brigadier General of the United States Air Force: Van N. Backman who obtained his Bachelor of Arts degree in 1955, and Patricia C. Lewis, who earned her master's degree from the university in 1977. Ernesto Domingo, a National Scientist of the Philippines, also graduated from the university. Alfredo Bengzon, the President and CEO of The Medical City obtained his doctor of medicine degree from the university. UPM alumni in academia include Paulo Campos, who was known for his work on nuclear medicine, Luciano P.R. Santiago, and Gregorio F. Zaide. The latter two are multi-awarded historians. In film, entertainment, and television, UPM is represented by comedian actress Maricel Laxa, and Vinci Montaner, a founding member of the band Parokya ni Edgar. Other prominent graduates include Victoria Tauli-Corpuz, an international activist for Igorot ethnicity and Norman King, the first Aeta graduate of the entire university system.

Some people, such as Diosdado Macapagal, the 9th Philippine President, Paz Latorena, a writer, and Grace Poe, a senator, attended UPM but did not graduate. Internationally recognized actor Elijah Canlas is currently taking BA Philippine Arts at the university.

See also
 University of the Philippines Baguio
 University of the Philippines Los Baños
 University of the Philippines Cebu
 University of the Philippines Visayas
 University of the Philippines Mindanao

References

Further reading
 Publications. UP Manila Publications.
 History of UP Manila. University of the Philippines Manila.
 University History. University of the Philippines.
 PGH History. Philippine General Hospital.

External links 

 University of the Philippines
 University of the Philippines Manila
 Philippine General Hospital

 
University of the Philippines
1905 establishments in the Philippines
Educational institutions established in 1905
Education in Ermita
State universities and colleges in Manila
Universities and colleges in Manila
Research universities in the Philippines
National Historical Landmarks of the Philippines